Payamdüzü is a village in the Çemişgezek District, Tunceli Province, Turkey. The village is populated by Kurds of the Qoçan and Şikakî tribes and had a population of 423 in 2021.

The hamlet of Köçek is attached to the village.

References 

Kurdish settlements in Tunceli Province
Villages in Çemişgezek District